Gerhardus Engelbertus "Erik" Cent (born 29 March 1962 in Goor) is a track cyclist from the Netherlands. He competed in the men's team pursuit and men's individual pursuit at the 1988 Summer Olympics and in the men's team pursuit at the 1992 Summer Olympics.

See also
 List of Dutch Olympic cyclists

References

1962 births
Dutch male cyclists
Olympic cyclists of the Netherlands
Cyclists at the 1992 Summer Olympics
Cyclists at the 1988 Summer Olympics
People from Hof van Twente
Living people
Cyclists from Overijssel